Menomonee Falls is a village in Waukesha County, Wisconsin, United States, and is part of the Greater Milwaukee area. The population was 38,527 at the 2020 census, making it the most populous village in Wisconsin. It is the fourth largest community in Waukesha County.

History

Early 1800s 
The area that became Menomonee Falls was first inhabited by Native Americans, including the people of the Menominee and Chippewa tribes. The town of Menomonee was created in December 1839.

Late 1800s 
The Menomonee Falls area continued to grow throughout the 1870s. By 1890, the population of the area was 2,480. In 1892, a section of the town of Menomonee was incorporated as the village of Menomonee Falls. In 1894 the first village board was elected and the first village fire department formed. After becoming a village, many important buildings were built, including the village hall/fire station, Menomonee Falls High School, and the Wisconsin Sugar Factory. The Wisconsin Sugar Factory employed as many as 500 laborers and produced up to 15 million pounds of sugar annually.

Early 1900s 
The first public telephone service was offered in 1902; a local electricity plant offered a substitute for kerosene lamps by 1907; water mains were installed in the 1910s; and the first sewer lines were laid in 1924. New neighborhoods were developed and the Menomonee Falls Public Library was built. The village's second bank, the Farmers and Merchants Bank, was established in 1908 by attorney Samuel A. Connell. By 1910, automobiles started being sold in the village, which led to an increase in paved roads. By 1919, Highway 15 connected Menomonee Falls to Milwaukee and Illinois and, by 1922, to Green Bay.

In the early 20th century, a new municipal building was built to house village offices, the fire department, the police department, and a new Menomonee Falls Public Library. A subdivision named Hiawatha Heights added 58 single-family homes with 95% of the home buyers relocating from Milwaukee. By 1940, the population had come to 3,674. Along with all of this, the building of shopping areas had begun, including the Hiawatha Shopping Center, which today can be seen along Appleton Avenue, with Krueger's Entertainment and Pop's Custard as the main attractions.

Mid-1900s 
In the 1950s, more subdivisions were built, and US 41 was completed. This increased the attractiveness of Menomonee Falls as there was now an easy commute to Milwaukee jobs. In 1958, the village of Menomonee Falls annexed the remainder of the Town of Menomonee, which increased the total area from 2 square miles to 32 square miles and the population from 4,500 to 12,000.

In the 1960s, the school district built six new schools because of population growth in the baby boom era. In 1965, a can manufacturing plant with a capacity of 150 million cans per year was established in the village, owned by Containers, Inc., a joint venture of the Miller Brewing Company and Carnation Company. "By the end of the 1960s, 48 percent of the population in the Village was 19 years old or under." Both a better park system and better public services were developed. Several full-time police officers were hired, along with full-time firefighters. Shopping centers were developed and major employers established in the village, including Harley-Davidson and Wacker Neuson. Old structures were razed to make way for several new streets.

Late 1900s 
Near the end of the 20th century, Menomonee Falls continued to grow in population. Between 1990 and 2010, the population had grown by almost 9,000. New subdivisions and apartments were built in the community. Reports in 2016 state, "As of 2016, the Village had an estimated 36,907 residents and had become an important economic hub of Greater Milwaukee area." Major business developments include Kohl's Corporate campus and the Westbrook Corporate Center. A new village hall/municipal center was built and a new Library.

Geography

Neighborhoods
Fussville was once a separate unincorporated community; it was annexed by Menomonee Falls sometime between 1950 and 1960.

Demographics

2010 census
As of the census of 2010, there were 35,626 people, 14,567 households, and 10,028 families residing in the village. The racial makeup of the village was 91.6% White, 3.0% African American, 0.2% Native American, 3.5% Asian, 0.4% from other races, and 1.3% from two or more races. Hispanic or Latino of any race were 2.0% of the population.

There were 14,567 households, of which 30.5% had children under the age of 18 living with them, 59.1% were married couples living together, 6.9% had a female householder with no husband present, 2.9% had a male householder with no wife present, and 31.2% were non-families. 26.8% of all households were made up of individuals, and 14% had someone living alone who was 65 years of age or older. The average household size was 2.43 and the average family size was 2.97.

The median age in the village was 43.3 years. 23% of residents were under the age of 18; 6% were between the ages of 18 and 24; 23.5% were from 25 to 44; 29.6% were from 45 to 64; and 17.8% were 65 years of age or older. The gender makeup of the village was 48.2% male and 51.8% female.

Economy
The overall economy of Menomonee Falls employs 18,839 people and "is specialized in Management of Companies and Enterprises; Manufacturing; and Wholesale trade". The largest industries in the Village are manufacturing, healthcare/social assistance, and retail trade which employ 3,917, 2,704 and 2,465 people respectively. Income per capita with adults and children included is $36,386 with the median household income in Menomonee Falls being $73,350. The average male salary is $93,192 and average female salary is $61,294. The unemployment rate is 4.00% with a job growth of 0.73%. Sales tax is 5.1% and income tax is at 6.27%. Its poverty rate is 3.72%.

Companies based in Menomonee Falls include Kohl's and Enerpac Tool Group.

Top employers
According to Menomonee Falls's 2017 Comprehensive Annual Financial Report, the top employers in the village are:

Parks and recreation 
A 150-acre, 18 hole golf course, partially completed in the mid-1960s, sits at the south east corner of the village.

In the mid-1950s, the village held an Annual Field Day, an annual all-village family fair, part of the village's recreation program.

Government
Menomonee Falls has a governing body consisting of a board president and a six-member board of trustees. The current village board president is Dave Glasgow. The Trustees are: Katie Kress, Randy Van Alstyne, Tim Newman, Paul Tadda, Jeremy Walz, and Steve Taggart.

Education 

Menomonee Falls School District, which covers much of Menomonee Falls, operates Menomonee Falls High School, North Middle School, Benjamin Franklin Elementary School, Riverside Elementary School, Valley View Elementary School, and Shady Lane Elementary School. Saint Mary's Catholic School, Calvary Baptist School, Grace Lutheran School, Bethlehem Lutheran School, Zion Lutheran School, and Aquinas Academy are private schools in Menomonee Falls.

Southwestern portions of Menomonee Falls lie within the Hamilton School District, which also serves all of the communities of Sussex, Lannon, and Butler, portions of Lisbon, and a small part of Pewaukee.

Media

 The Menomonee Falls Express News
 The Menomonee Falls Gazette (1971–1978) – comic strip publication
 The Menomonee Falls Guardian (1973–1976) – comic strip publication
 Menomonee Falls Now

Infrastructure
As of 1967, the water supply for the village was provided by a set of four wells, providing a daily water capacity of five million gallons.

Transportation
Milwaukee County Transit System bus routes 61 & 79 serve Menomonee Falls

Notable people

 Josh Bilicki, NASCAR driver
 Mark Borchardt, independent filmmaker
 Mel Eslyn, film producer
 Brett Hartmann, National Football League punter
 George E. Hoyt, Wisconsin State Representative and Senator
 Andy Hurley, drummer of Fall Out Boy
 Elmer Klumpp, Major League Baseball player
 Cree Myles, influencer, writer and organizer
 Victor Nehs, Wisconsin State Representative
 Justus Henry Nelson, Methodist missionary in the Amazon
 John H. Niebler, Wisconsin State Representative
 Vic Perrin, actor
 Richard Riehle, actor
 Lolita Schneiders, Wisconsin State Representative
 Barry Schultz, professional disc golfer
 James Sensenbrenner, U.S. congressman
 Mike Solwold, NFL player
 Peter J. Somers, U.S. congressman
 Jessica Szohr, actress
 Bob Uecker, baseball radio broadcaster
 Joel Whitburn, music historian
 Mark Wilson, five-time winner on the PGA Tour

See also
 List of villages in Wisconsin

References

External links

 
 Sanborn fire insurance map: 1910
 

 
Villages in Wisconsin
Villages in Waukesha County, Wisconsin
1892 establishments in Wisconsin